People of Paradox: An Inquiry Concerning the Origins of American Civilization is a 1972 book by American cultural historian Michael Kammen, published by Knopf. It explores various contradictions in American society, such as puritanism vs. hedonism and idealism vs. materialism. People of Paradox was awarded the Pulitzer Prize for History in 1973.

References 

1972 non-fiction books
Pulitzer Prize for History-winning works
History books about the United States
Alfred A. Knopf books